Turquoise emperor may refer to:

 Apaturina erminea, an Old World butterfly
 Doxocopa laurentia, a New World butterfly

Animal common name disambiguation pages